Bis(pentafluorophenyl)xenon,  is an unstable organic compound of xenon. It consists of two fluorinated phenyl rings connected to xenon.

Structure
Bis(pentafluorophenyl)xenon is a molecular substance. In the solid form it crystallises in the monoclinic system with space group P21/n. The unit cell has four molecules with a = 13.635 Å. b = 8.248 Å. c = 11.511 Å, β = 102.624°. The unit cell volume is 1263.18 Å3.

The molecules have carbon to xenon to carbon bonds in nearly a straight line (the bond angle is at least 175°). The carbon–xenon bond-lengths are 2.35 and 2.39 Å. The two pentafluorophenyl rings are twisted by 72° with respect to each other.

Properties
Bis(pentafluorophenyl)xenon decomposes above −20 °C and can explode.

Preparation
Xe(C6F5)2 is prepared from the [(CH3)4N]F catalyzed reactions of (CH3)3SiC6F5 and XeF2 in propionitrile, propionitrile/acetonitrile, acetonitrile, or CH2Cl2 , at -60 to -40 °C as the first [10-Xe-2] species with two xenon-carbon bonds as a colorless solid that decomposes above −20 °C and spontaneously at 20 °C. C6F5XeF, is formed  as an intermediate which has been characterized by NMR spectroscopy.

XeF2 + (CH3)3SiC6F5 → C6F5XeF + (CH3)3SiF

XeF2 + 2 (CH3)3SiC6F5 → Xe(C6F5)2 + 2 (CH3)3SiF

Xe(C6F5)2 is also formed from the reaction of C6F5XeF with Cd(C6F5)2  

2 C6F5XeF + Cd(C6F5)2 → Xe(C6F5)2 + CdF2

However, the direct introduction of the C6F5 group into XeF2 with Cd(C6F5)2 is not successful.

Bis(pentafluorophenyl)xenon is crystallized from dichloromethane at −40 °C.

Reactions
Bis(pentafluorophenyl)xenon reacts with mercury to make bis(pentafluorophenyl)mercury.

Bis(pentafluorophenyl)xenon reacts with hydrogen fluoride to form pentafluorophenyl xenon fluoride C6F5XeF.
In acetonitrile solution bis(pentafluorophenyl)xenon decomposes to form C6F5-C6F5 (C12F10) and xenon. But in dichloromethane solution the product is mostly pentafluorobenzene.

It reacts with iodine to make  (C6F5I).

References

Xenon(II) compounds
Pentafluorophenyl compounds